The 2016 Rugby Europe Women's Sevens Conference was the third level of international women's rugby sevens competitions organised by Rugby Europe during 2016. It featured one tournament hosted in Sarajevo, Bosnia and Herzegovina. The winners and runners up, Latvia and Malta respectively, were promoted to the 2017 Trophy series.

Pool stages

Pool A

Pool B

Pool C

Pool D

Knockout stage

Shield

Bowl

Plate

Cup

Final standings

References

B
2016
International sports competitions hosted by Bosnia and Herzegovina
Europe
2016 in Bosnia and Herzegovina sport